Tortrix molybditis is a species of moth of the family Tortricidae. It is endemic to New Zealand. It is likely that this species probably belongs to another genus and as such this species is also known as Tortrix (s.l.) molybditis.

References

Moths described in 1907
Tortricini
Moths of New Zealand
Taxa named by Edward Meyrick
Endemic fauna of New Zealand
Endemic moths of New Zealand